Corral Ridge or Corral Hollow Hill, a minor summit in the Sierra Nevada, is the highest point in Calaveras County. Located near the Alpine county line, it is east of the Salt Springs Reservoir and west of the town of Bear Valley.
Due to its high elevation much of the precipitation that the summit receives is in the form of snow.

See also 
 Stanislaus National Forest

References

External Links
 

Mountains of the Sierra Nevada (United States)
Mountains of Calaveras County, California
Mountains of Northern California